My Sixteen Sons (German: Meine 16 Söhne) is a 1956 West German musical drama film directed by Hans Domnick and starring Lil Dagover, Karl Ludwig Diehl and Else Reval. The film's sets were designed by the art director Gabriel Pellon.

Synopsis
Frau Giselius hosts a music competition in Bremen in memory of her son who was killed in the Second World War. She promote wider European harmony she invites four string quartet, two from Germany and one each from France and Switzerland. She affectionatly refers to the competitors as her "sixteen sons".

Cast
 Lil Dagover as Frau Senator Giselius
 Margrit Kay as  Renate Giselius, ihre Schwiegertochter
 Karl Ludwig Diehl as  Dr. Wesendahl
 Else Reval as  Lina, Haushälterin bei Frau Giselius
 Herbert Hübner as Direktor der Berliner Musikhochschule
 Kurt Vespermann as  Prof. Peinemann
 Erich Hasberg as Kulturreferent Thormann
 Helmuth Lohner as  Dieter Ranke
 Harry Meyen as  Herbert Schwerdtfeger
 Lutz Moik as  Christian Massow
 Klaus Günter Neumann as Paul Selters
 Beat Hadorn as  Gottfried Baumann
 Jan Corazolla as  Baptiste Tessie

References

Bibliography
 Bock, Hans-Michael & Bergfelder, Tim. The Concise CineGraph. Encyclopedia of German Cinema. Berghahn Books, 2009.

External links 
 

1956 films
1956 drama films
German drama films
West German films
1950s German-language films
1950s German films

de:Meine 16 Söhne